The Pelmadulla Divisional Secretariat is a divisional secretariat in the Ratnapura District of the Sabaragamuwa Province of Sri Lanka.

During the final period of the Kandy era, the Sabaragamuwa region was divided into six cantons:

Kuruvita Korale
Nawadun Korale
Kolonna Korale
Gravets and Center Korale
Atakalan Korale
Kukulu Korale

The Pelmadulla Divisional Secretariat belongs to the upper and middle parishes of Nawadun Korale.

It is located in the center of the Ratnapura district. Compared with other divisional secretariats in the district, it is the twelfth largest by area. It spans about 14,674 hectares and covers 4.46% of the Rathnapura district, or 0.22% of Sri Lanka.

Location
The province of Sabaragamuwa is located in south Sri Lanka.

The boundaries of the Pelmadulla Divisional Secretariat are:

History
P.E.P Deraniyagala discovered remains of homo sapiens balangodensis (Balangoda Man) in Bulathwatta, providing evidence that the region of the present-day Pelmadulla secretariat has been inhabited since prehistoric times. A number of huts were also unearthed, originally built to provide shelter for ancient carters. This gave rise to the name 'Pelmadulla' for the area, meaning cluster of huts in Sinhalese.

The temple on the Denawaka and Kehelbaddala river basin was called Dronawakka Viharaya during the reign of King Vijayabahu I. The Nampotha (a book written in the Kandy period about important Buddhist centers) mentions this temple in its 203rd entry as Denawaka Viharaya, now known as Aramunapola Viharaya. This latest renaming is credited to monks who arrived from Arammanadesh in Myanmar. The Pelmadulla divisional secretariat was established according to the sixth chapter of the Boundary Determination Act (no 22/1955) which was issued in 1955, as an assistant government agent division. Since then, the region has seen a marked increase in Grama Niladhari divisions:

Under the Gamsabha administration, the Pelmadulla divisional secretariat was administrated under 3 Gam Karya Sabhas (staff council) and one semi-urban council. They were:
 Pelmadulla semi-urban council
Pelmadulla Gam karya sabha
Pathakada Gam karya sabha
Marapana Gam karya sabha

According to Act no. 58/1992, the Pelmadulla divisional secretariat's office was installed in 1992.

Currently, the Pelmadulla Divisional Secretariat area is locally administrated by the Pelmadulla Pradeshiya Sabha (Divisional Council).

Ancient places
Pelmadulla Rajamaha Viharaya
Ganegama Aramunupola Viharaya
Girawatta memorial
Galpoththawala Sri Pada Viharaya 
Meegahagoda Viharaya

Physical features
The Pelmadulla division can be divided into four main zones:

Kuttapitiya mountain range
Kiribathgala mountain range
Denawaka valley
Way valley

Kuttapitiya mountain range
This zone is located in the northern area of the division. The Kuttapitiya mountain (969 m) is the highest in the range, where the Kirindi Ella waterfall is also found.

Kiribathgala mountain range
This zone is located in the southern area of the division. The Kiribathgala Mountain (948m) is the highest in the range, where the Pulun Ella waterfall is also found.

Denawaka valley
The Denawaka rivers flow in the valley between Kuttapitiya and Kiribathgala mountain ranges. This zone is the most populous.

Way valley
The Way river flows in the southern boundary of the division.

Drainage
The main rivers in division

Denawaka river
Way river
Hangamu river

Waterfalls
 Kirindi Ella (116 m)
 Pulun Ella (105 m)
 Gerandi Ella (105 m)
 Rajana Ella (67.5 m)
 Lihini Ella (30 m)
 Kuda Ella (30 m)
 Hathbili Ella (11 m)
 Marakkala Ella (10.5 m)
 Ballan Damana Ella

References

External links
 Divisional Secretariats Portal

Divisional Secretariats of Ratnapura District